
This is a list of the 33 players who earned 2018 European Tour cards through Q School in 2017.

 2018 European Tour rookie
 First-time member ineligible for Rookie of the Year award

2018 Results

* European Tour rookie in 2018
† First-time member ineligible for Rookie of the Year award
T = Tied 
 The player retained his European Tour card for 2019 (finished inside the top 115).
 The player did not retain his European Tour card for 2019, but retained conditional status (finished between 115 and 155, inclusive).
 The player did not retain his European Tour card for 2019 (finished outside the top 155).

Winners on the European Tour in 2018

Runners-up on the European Tour in 2018

See also
2017 Challenge Tour graduates
2018 European Tour

References

External links
Official website

European Tour
European Tour Qualifying School Graduates
European Tour Qualifying School Graduates